Lopatov (from лопата meaning spade) is a Russian masculine surname, its feminine counterpart is Lopatova. Notable people with the surname include:

Andrey Lopatov (born 1957), Soviet basketball player

See also
Lipatov

Russian-language surnames